Odessa Piper (born Karen Odessa Piper, October 15, 1952) is an American restaurateur and chef.

Early life
Odessa Piper was born in Pearl City, Territory of Hawaii, grew up in Portsmouth, New Hampshire, and developed an interest in food when she worked at a farm in Canaan, New Hampshire, which was led by a group that was interested in sustainable agriculture.

In 1969, Piper moved to Madison, Wisconsin, and worked with a mentor, JoAnna Guthrie, in Guthrie's restaurant, Ovens of Brittany. Piper was influenced by Guthrie, who used organic meats and produce that had been harvested or produced locally.

Career
Piper and a partner co-founded the restaurant L'Etoile in Madison in 1976; Piper eventually assumed full ownership of the restaurant. Like Ovens of Brittany, the restaurant uses local meat and produce, including the wares of local farmers that are featured at the noted Dane County Farmers' Market (which occurs adjacent to the restaurant). L'Etoile is part of a late 20th-century movement among some restaurants to create local cuisine using only regional food ingredients. (Other such restaurants include Alice Waters' Chez Panisse in Berkeley, California and Sinclair and Frederique Philip's Sooke Harbour House on Vancouver Island in British Columbia, Canada.) In 2001 Piper won a James Beard Award for Best Chef: Midwest and L'Etoile was #14 on Gourmet's list of America's 50 Best Restaurants. She sold the restaurant, to her chef de cuisine Tory Miller, in 2005.

Piper's work has been featured in Fine Cooking, Food & Wine, Bon Appetit, and Wine Spectator; she has been featured on NPR and on Wisconsin Public Radio. Her creations have appeared in many restaurants and on the menu at the White House.

Personal life
Odessa Piper is married to the international wine importer, Terry Theise and lives in Roslindale, Boston.

References 

American women restaurateurs
Businesspeople from Madison, Wisconsin
Living people
1953 births
American women chefs
James Beard Foundation Award winners
American chefs
21st-century American women